The Czech Republic competed at the 1998 Winter Olympics in Nagano, Japan.
The medal hopes were set on ice hockey team and Kateřina Neumannová in cross-country skiing. The ice hockey team won their first gold medal in history. Kateřina Neumannová was also successful, winning one silver and one bronze medal. The surprise performance for the team was freestyle skier Aleš Valenta who came fourth.

Medalists

Alpine skiing

Men

Men's combined

Women

Women's combined

Biathlon

Men

Men's 4 × 7.5 km relay

Women

Women's 4 × 7.5 km relay

 1 A penalty loop of 150 metres had to be skied per missed target.
 2 One minute added per missed target.

Bobsleigh

Cross-country skiing

Men

 1 Starting delay based on 10 km results. 
 C = Classical style, F = Freestyle

Men's 4 × 10 km relay

Women

 2 Starting delay based on 5 km results. 
 C = Classical style, F = Freestyle

Women's 4 × 5 km relay

Figure skating

Women

Pairs

Ice Dancing

Freestyle skiing

Men

Ice hockey

Men's tournament

First Round - Group D

Quarter-final

Semi-final

Gold Medal Game

Nordic combined 

Men's individual

Events:
 normal hill ski jumping
 15 km cross-country skiing 

Men's Team

Four participants per team.

Events:
 normal hill ski jumping
 5 km cross-country skiing

Ski jumping 

Men's team large hill

 1 Four teams members performed two jumps each.

References

 Olympic Winter Games 1998, full results by sports-reference.com

Nations at the 1998 Winter Olympics
1998
1998 in Czech sport